Meadowlakes is a city in Burnet County, Texas, United States. The population was 1,777 at the 2010 census.

Geography

Demographics

2020 census

As of the 2020 United States census, there were 1,907 people, 888 households, and 648 families residing in the city.

2000 census
As of the census of 2000, there were 1,293 people, 573 households, and 472 families residing in the city. The population density was 1,673.2 people per square mile (648.4/km2). There were 599 housing units at an average density of 775.1/sq mi (300.4/km2). The racial makeup of the city was 97.83% White, 0.23% African American, 0.46% Native American, 0.77% Asian, 0.08% from other races, and 0.62% from two or more races. Hispanic or Latino of any race were 1.08% of the population.

There were 573 households, out of which 19.5% had children under the age of 18 living with them, 78.2% were married couples living together, 3.7% had a female householder with no husband present, and 17.5% were non-families. 16.1% of all households were made up of individuals, and 11.7% had someone living alone who was 65 years of age or older. The average household size was 2.26 and the average family size was 2.49.

In the city, the population was spread out, with 15.6% under the age of 18, 1.9% from 18 to 24, 14.7% from 25 to 44, 28.8% from 45 to 64, and 39.0% who were 65 years of age or older. The median age was 60 years. For every 100 females, there were 93.3 males. For every 100 females age 18 and over, there were 86.5 males.

The median income for a household in the city was $60,588, and the median income for a family was $67,206. Males had a median income of $51,912 versus $26,354 for females. The per capita income for the city was $32,779. About 2.5% of families and 2.5% of the population were below the poverty line, including 1.0% of those under age 18 and 2.7% of those age 65 or over.

See also
 Marble Falls Independent School District

References

External links
 City of Meadowlakes official website
 

Cities in Burnet County, Texas
Cities in Texas